Fundamentals of Biochemistry: Life at the Molecular Level is a biochemistry textbook written by Donald Voet, Judith G. Voet and Charlotte W. Pratt. Published by John Wiley & Sons, it is a common undergraduate biochemistry textbook. 

As of 2016, the book has been published in 5 editions.

References

Biochemistry textbooks